The 2011–12 New York Islanders season was the 40th season in the franchise's history. The team failed to qualify for the Stanley Cup playoffs for the fifth straight season.

Off-season
At the 2011 NHL Entry Draft, the Islanders selected playmaking center Ryan Strome from the Niagara IceDogs.

On July 1, 2011, the Islanders signed Marty Reasoner.

On August 1, 2011, a public referendum was held in Nassau County to authorize $400 million for a new coliseum as a home to the Islanders, a minor-league ballpark and other economic development projects. The plan was rejected by the voters, thus causing speculation that after the 2014–15 season, the Islanders may be moving.

Pre-season
On June 30, 2011, the Islanders announced that they will play five pre-season games including two games each against the Bruins and Devils, and the other one against the Flames. The Islanders' final game of the pre-season, which is against the Bruins, will take place at the Webster Bank Arena in Bridgeport, Connecticut.

Defenceman Mark Streit is named team captain, following Doug Weight's retirement.

Regular season

Playoffs
The Islanders attempted to qualify for the Stanley Cup playoffs for the first time since the 2006–07 season, but failed to do so for the fifth straight season.

Standings

Schedule and results

Pre-season

|- style="text-align:center; background:#fcc;"
| 1 || September 23 || 7:00pm || Boston || 3-6 || Nillson || TD Garden || 16,555 || 
|- style="text-align:center; background:#cfc;"
| 2 || September 24 || 7:00pm || New Jersey || 6–2 || Poulin || Nassau Veterans Memorial Coliseum || 7,107 || 
|- style="text-align:center; background:#fcc;"
| 3 || September 27 || 9:00pm || Calgary || 0-2 || Glencross || Scotiabank Saddledome || 19,289 || 
|- style="text-align:center; background:#fcc;"
| 4 || September 30 || 7:00pm || New Jersey || 0-1 || Clarkson || Prudential Center || 11,154 || 
|- style="text-align:center; background:#fcc;"
| 5 || October 1 || 7:00pm || Boston || 2-3 || Seidenberg || Webster Bank Arena(Bridgeport, CT) ||  8,489  || 
|-

Regular season

|- style="text-align:center; background:#fcc;"
| 1 || October 8 || 8:00pm || Florida || 0–2 || Montoya || Nassau Veterans Memorial Coliseum || 16,234 || Recap
|- style="text-align:center; background:#cfc;"
| 2 || October 10 || 1:00pm || Minnesota || 2–1 || Montoya || Nassau Veterans Memorial Coliseum || 11,278 || Recap
|- style="text-align:center; background:#cfc;"
| 3 || October 13 || 7:00pm || Tampa Bay || 5–1 || Montoya || Nassau Veterans Memorial Coliseum || 9,759 || Recap
|- style="text-align:center; background:#cfc;"
| 4 || October 15 || 7:00pm || NY Rangers || 4–2 || Nabokov  || Nassau Veterans Memorial Coliseum || 16,234  || Recap
|- style="text-align:center; background:#fcc;"
| 5 || October 20 || 7:30pm || @ Tampa Bay || 1–4 ||  Montoya  || St. Pete Times Forum ||  18,181  ||  Recap
|- style="text-align:center; background:#fcc;"
| 6 || October 22 || 7:30pm || @ Florida ||  2–4 ||  Nabokov  || BankAtlantic Center ||  15,411  ||  Recap
|- style="text-align:center; background:#fcc;"
| 7 || October 25 || 7:00pm || Pittsburgh || 0–3 ||  Nabokov  || Nassau Veterans Memorial Coliseum ||  10,681  ||  Recap
|-style="text-align:center; background:white;"
| 8 || October 27 || 7:00pm || @ Pittsburgh ||  2 – 3 (SO) || DiPietro || Consol Energy Center ||  18,461  ||  Recap
|-style="text-align:center; background:white;"
| 9 || October 29 || 7:00pm || San Jose ||  2 – 3 (OT)  ||  DiPietro || Nassau Veterans Memorial Coliseum ||  11,742  ||  Recap
|-

|-style="text-align:center; background:#fcc;"
| 10 || November 3 || 7:00pm || Winnipeg || 0–3 ||  DiPietro  || Nassau Veterans Memorial Coliseum ||  10,157  || Recap
|- style="text-align:center; background:#cfc;"
| 11 || November 5 || 7:00pm || Washington || 5–3 ||  DiPietro  || Nassau Veterans Memorial Coliseum ||  14,812  || Recap
|-style="text-align:center; background:#fcc;"
| 12 || November 7 || 7:00pm || @ Boston || 2–6 || Nabokov || TD Garden ||  17,565  || Recap
|-style="text-align:center; background:white;"
| 13 || November 10 || 9:00pm || @ Colorado || 3 – 4 (OT) || Montoya || Pepsi Center || 13,221 || Recap
|-style="text-align:center; background:#fcc;"
| 14 || November 13 || 9:00pm || @ Vancouver || 1–4 || Nabokov || Rogers Arena || 18,860 || Recap
|-style="text-align:center; background:#fcc;"
| 15 || November 15 || 7:00pm || NY Rangers || 2–4 || Nabokov || Nassau Veterans Memorial Coliseum || 16,234 || Recap
|- style="text-align:center; background:#cfc;"
| 16 || November 17 || 7:00pm || Montreal || 4–3 || DiPietro || Nassau Veterans Memorial Coliseum || 9,928 || Recap
|-style="text-align:center; background:#fcc;"
| 17 || November 19 || 7:00pm || Boston || 0–6 || DiPietro || Nassau Veterans Memorial Coliseum || 16,011 || Recap
|-style="text-align:center; background:#fcc;"
| 18 || November 21 || 7:00pm || @ Pittsburgh || 0–5 || Nilsson || Consol Energy Center || 18,571 || Recap
|-style="text-align:center; background:white;"
| 19 || November 23 || 7:00pm || Philadelphia || 3 – 4 (OT) || DiPietro || Nassau Veterans Memorial Coliseum || 11,086 || Recap
|-style="text-align:center; background:#fcc;"
| 20 || November 25 || 3:00pm || New Jersey || 0–1 || Montoya || Nassau Veterans Memorial Coliseum || 15,358 || Recap
|- style="text-align:center; background:#cfc;"
| 21 || November 26 || 1:00pm || @ New Jersey || 3–2 || Montoya || Prudential Center || 16,014 || Recap
|- style="text-align:center; background:#cfc;"
| 22 || November 29 || 7:00pm || @ Buffalo || 2–1 || Montoya || First Niagara Center || 18,690 || Recap
|-

|-style="text-align:center; background:white;"
| 23 || December 2 || 8:30pm || @ Chicago || 4 – 5 (SO) || Montoya || United Center || 21,463 || Recap
|- style="text-align:center; background:#cfc;"
| 24 || December 3 || 8:30pm || @ Dallas || 5–4 || DiPietro || American Airlines Center || 14,423 || Recap
|- style="text-align:center; background:#cfc;"
| 25 || December 6 || 7:00pm || Tampa Bay || 5–1 || Montoya || Nassau Veterans Memorial Coliseum || 9,486 || Recap
|-style="text-align:center; background:white;"
| 26 || December 8 || 7:00pm || Chicago || 2 – 3 (OT) || Montoya || Nassau Veterans Memorial Coliseum || 10,711 || Recap
|-style="text-align:center; background:#fcc;"
| 27 || December 10 || 7:00pm || Pittsburgh || 3–6 || Montoya || Nassau Veterans Memorial Coliseum || 15,638 || Recap
|-style="text-align:center; background:#fcc;"
| 28 || December 13 || 7:30pm || @ Montreal || 3–5 || Montoya || Bell Centre || 21,273 || Recap
|-style="text-align:center; background:#fcc;"
| 29 || December 15 || 7:00pm || Dallas || 2–3 || Poulin || Nassau Veterans Memorial Coliseum || 9,288 || Recap
|- style="text-align:center; background:#cfc;"
| 30 || December 17 || 8:00pm || @ Minnesota || 2 – 1 (SO) || Montoya || XCel Energy Center || 18,209 || Recap
|- style="text-align:center; background:#cfc;"
| 31 || December 20 || 8:30pm || @ Winnipeg || 3 – 2 (SO) || Nabokov || MTS Centre || 15,004 || Recap
|-style="text-align:center; background:#fcc;"
| 32 || December 22 || 7:00pm || @ NY Rangers || 2–4 || Nabokov || Madison Square Garden || 18,200 || Recap
|-style="text-align:center; background:#fcc;"
| 33 || December 23 || 7:00pm || Toronto || 3–5 || Nabokov || Nassau Veterans Memorial Coliseum || 12,432 || Recap
|-style="text-align:center; background:#fcc;"
| 34 || December 26 || 7:00pm || @ NY Rangers || 0–3 || Nabokov || Madison Square Garden || 18,200 || Recap
|- style="text-align:center; background:#cfc;"
| 35 || December 29 || 7:00pm || Calgary || 3–1 || Nabokov || Nassau Veterans Memorial Coliseum || 14,819 || Recap
|- style="text-align:center; background:#cfc;"
| 36 || December 31 || 1:00pm || Edmonton || 4–1 || Nabokov || Nassau Veterans Memorial Coliseum || 13,807 || Recap
|-

|- style="text-align:center; background:#cfc;"
| 37 || January 3 || 7:00pm || @ Carolina || 4 – 3 (SO) || Nabokov || RBC Center || 13,828 || Recap
|-style="text-align:center; background:#fcc;"
| 38 || January 6 || 10:00pm || @ Anaheim || 2–4 || Nabokov || Honda Center || 13,892 || Recap
|-style="text-align:center; background:#fcc;"
| 39 || January 7 || 8:00pm || @ Phoenix || 1–5 || Nabokov || Jobing.com Arena || 13,350 || Recap
|-style="text-align:center; background:#fcc;"
| 40 || January 10 || 7:00pm || Detroit || 5-1 || Nabokov || Nassau Veterans Memorial Coliseum || 12,864 || Recap
|-style="text-align:center; background:#fcc;"
| 41 || January 12 || 7:00pm || Philadelphia || 2–3 || Nabokov || Nassau Veterans Memorial Coliseum || 11,751 || Recap
|- style="text-align:center; background:#cfc;"
| 42 || January 14 || 7:00pm || Buffalo || 4–2 || Nabokov || Nassau Veterans Memorial Coliseum || 13,848 || Recap
|-style="text-align:center; background:#fcc;"
| 43 || January 16 || 1:00pm || Nashville || 1–3 || Poulin || Nassau Veterans Memorial Coliseum || 10,755 || Recap
|- style="text-align:center; background:#cfc;"
| 44 || January 17 || 7:00pm || @ Washington || 3–0 || Nabokov || Verizon Center || 18,506 || Recap
|- style="text-align:center; background:#cfc;"
| 45 || January 19 || 7:00pm || @ Philadelphia || 4–1 || Nabokov || Wells Fargo Center || 19,796 || Recap
|- style="text-align:center; background:#cfc;"
| 46 || January 21 || 7:00pm || Carolina || 2 – 1 (OT) || Nabokov || Nassau Veterans Memorial Coliseum || 13,622 || Recap
|-style="text-align:center; background:#fcc;"
| 47 || January 23 || 7:00pm || @ Toronto || 0–3 || Nabokov || Air Canada Centre || 19,570 || Recap
|-style="text-align:center; background:white;"
| 48 || January 24 || 7:00pm || Toronto || 3 – 4 (OT) || Montoya || Nassau Veterans Memorial Coliseum || 10,888 || Recap
|- style="text-align:center; background:#cfc;"
| 49 || January 31 || 7:00pm || @ Carolina || 5–2 || Poulin || RBC Center || 15,575 || Recap
|-

|- style="text-align:center; background:#cfc;"
| 50 || February 3 || 7:30pm || @ Ottawa || 2–1 (OT) || Nabokov || Scotiabank Place || 18,252 || Recap
|-style="text-align:center; background:white;"
| 51 || February 4 || 7:00pm || Buffalo || 3–4 (SO) || Montoya || Nassau Veterans Memorial Coliseum || 14,618 || Recap
|-style="text-align:center; background:#cfc;"
| 52 || February 7 || 7:00pm || @ Philadelphia || 1–0 (SO) || Nabokov || Wells Fargo Center || 19,614 || Recap
|-style="text-align:center; background:#fcc;"
| 53 || February 9 || 7:00pm || Montreal || 2–4 || Nabokov || Nassau Veterans Memorial Coliseum || 12,312 || Recap
|-style="text-align:center; background:#cfc;"
| 54 || February 11 || 1:00pm || Los Angeles || 2–1 (OT) || Nabokov || Nassau Veterans Memorial Coliseum || 13,079 || Recap
|-style="text-align:center; background:#fcc;"
| 55 || February 12 || 3:00pm || Florida || 1–4 || Nabokov || Nassau Veterans Memorial Coliseum || 14,179 || Recap
|-style="text-align:center; background:#cfc;"
| 56 || February 14 || 8:30pm || @ Winnipeg || 3–1 || Nabokov || MTS Center || 15,004 || Recap
|-style="text-align:center; background:#fcc;"
| 57 || February 16 || 8:00pm || @ St. Louis || 1–5 || Montoya || Scottrade Center || 18,434 || Recap
|-style="text-align:center; background:#cfc;"
| 58 || February 18 || 7:00pm || Carolina || 4–3 || Poulin || Nassau Veterans Memorial Coliseum || 11,818 || Recap
|-style="text-align:center; background:#fcc;"
| 59 || February 20 || 1:00pm || Ottawa || 0–6 || Poulin || Nassau Veterans Memorial Coliseum || 15,818 || Recap
|-style="text-align:center; background:#fcc;"
| 60 || February 21 || 7:00pm || @ Buffalo || 1–2 || Poulin || First Niagara Center || 18,690 || Recap
|-style="text-align:center; background:#cfc;"
| 61 || February 24 || 7:00pm || NY Rangers || 4–3 (SO) || Nabokov || Nassau Veterans Memorial Coliseum || 16,250 || Recap
|-style="text-align:center; background:#fcc;"
| 62 || February 26 || 5:00pm || @ Ottawa || 2–5 || Nabokov || Scotiabank Place || 19,660 || Recap
|-style="text-align:center; background:white;"
| 63 || February 28 || 7:00pm || @ Washington || 2–3 (OT) || Nabokov || Verizon Center || 18,506 || Recap
|-

|-style="text-align:center; background:#fcc;"
| 64 || March 1 || 7:00pm || @ Philadelphia || 3–6 || Nabokov || Wells Fargo Center || 19,674 || Recap
|-style="text-align:center; background:#cfc;"
| 65 || March 3 || 1:00pm || @ Boston || 3–2 || Nabokov || TD Garden || 17,565 || Recap
|-style="text-align:center; background:#cfc;"
| 66 || March 4 || 3:00pm || New Jersey || 1–0 || Nilsson || Nassau Veterans Memorial Coliseum || 16,250 || Recap
|-style="text-align:center; background:#fcc;"
| 67 || March 8 || 7:00pm || @ New Jersey || 1–5 || Nabokov || Prudential Center || 14,573 || Recap
|-style="text-align:center; background:#fcc;"
| 68 || March 10 || 7:00pm || New Jersey || 1–2 || Nilsson || Nassau Veterans Memorial Coliseum || 16,250 || Recap
|-style="text-align:center; background:white;"
| 69 || March 11 || 7:00pm || @ NY Rangers || 3–4 (OT) || Nabokov || Madison Square Garden || 18,200 || Recap
|-style="text-align:center; background:white;"
| 70 || March 13 || 7:00pm || Washington || 4–5 (SO) || Nabokov || Nassau Veterans Memorial Coliseum || 11,488 || Recap
|-style="text-align:center; background:#fcc;"
| 71 || March 15 || 7:00pm || Philadelphia || 2–3 || Nabokov || Nassau Veterans Memorial Coliseum || 13,827 || Recap
|-style="text-align:center; background:#cfc;"
| 72 || March 17 || 7:00pm || @ Montreal || 3–2 (SO) || Montoya || Bell Centre || 21,273 || Recap
|-style="text-align:center; background:#cfc;"
| 73 || March 20 || 7:00pm || @ Toronto || 5–2 || Nabokov || Air Canada Centre || 19,351 || Recap
|-style="text-align:center; background:#fcc;"
| 74 || March 24 || 7:00pm || @ Tampa Bay || 3–4 || Montoya || St. Pete Times Forum || 19,204 || Recap
|-style="text-align:center; background:#cfc;"
| 75 || March 25 || 5:00pm || @ Florida || 3–2 (SO) || Nabokov || BankAtlantic Center || 16,814 || Recap
|-style="text-align:center; background:#cfc;"
| 76 || March 27 || 7:00pm || @ Pittsburgh || 5–3 || Nabokov || Consol Energy Center || 18,588 || Recap
|-style="text-align:center; background:#cfc;"
| 77 || March 29 || 7:00pm || Pittsburgh || 5–3 || Montoya || Nassau Veterans Memorial Coliseum || 12,018 || Recap
|-style="text-align:center; background:#fcc;"
| 78 || March 31 || 1:00pm || Boston || 3–6 || Montoya || Nassau Veterans Memorial Coliseum || 16,250 || Recap
|-

|-style="text-align:center; background:#fcc;"
| 79 || April 1 || 3:00pm || Ottawa || 1–5 || Montoya || Nassau Veterans Memorial Coliseum || 14,210 || Recap
|-style="text-align:center; background:#fcc;"
| 80 || April 3 || 7:00pm || @ New Jersey || 1–3 || Montoya || Prudential Center || 15,482 || Recap
|-style="text-align:center; background:#cfc;"
| 81 || April 5 || 7:00pm || Winnipeg || 5–4 || Montoya || Nassau Veterans Memorial Coliseum || 13,048 || Recap
|-style="text-align:center; background:#fcc;"
| 82 || April 7 || 7:00pm || @ Columbus || 3–7 || Montoya || Nationwide Arena || 17,652 || Recap
|-

Player statistics

Skaters
Note: GP = Games played; G = Goals; A = Assists; Pts = Points; +/− = Plus/minus; PIM = Penalty minutes

Goaltenders
Note: GP = Games played; TOI = Time on ice (minutes); W = Wins; L = Losses; OT = Overtime losses; GA = Goals against; GAA= Goals against average; SA= Shots against; SV= Saves; Sv% = Save percentage; SO= Shutouts

†Denotes player spent time with another team before joining Islanders. Stats reflect time with Islanders only.
‡Traded mid-season. Stats reflect time with Islanders only.

Awards and records

Awards

Records

Milestones

Transactions
The Islanders have been involved in the following transactions during the 2011–12 season:

Trades

Free agents signed

Free agents lost

Claimed via waivers

Lost via waivers

Lost via retirement

Player signings

Draft picks

See also 
 2011–12 NHL season

References

New York Islanders seasons
New York Islanders
New York Islanders
New York Islanders
New York Islanders